Babiana cinnamomea is a perennial plant of about  high that annually forms leaves and flowers from an underground corm that is assigned to the iris family. It has inconspicuous pale greenish yellow flowers and broad, hairless, pleated leaves with undulating margins. Flowers may be found in May and June. It occurs in the very north of the Western Cape province of South Africa.

Description 
The stem is completely underground, unbranched and hairless. The blade sits at an almost right angle atop a sheath that envelops the sheaths of higher leaves. Immature corms however carry slender, line-shaped leaves with few long soft hairs.

The flowers have a strong, sweet, spicy scent reminiscent of cloves or cinnamon and sit with two to six together in a spike with an upturning tip. Each flower is subtended by two bracts that are green at the base but become translucently straw-coloured with very small brown spots and dry towards the tip. The inner bract is forked at the tip only. The base colour of the mirror-symmetrical perianth is pale yellow, variably marked with mauve. The upper lateral tepals and the lower petals are joint for about 6 mm further up and together form a lower lip. Below the perianth tube sits an ovary that is hairless. From the ovary the style emerges, which splits into three branches of about 3 mm (0.14 in) long at the same height as the tip of the anthers. This species flowers in May and June.

Taxonomy and naming 
This species was first described by John Charles Manning and Peter Goldblatt in 2007, based on specimens collected by Manning in 2002. So far, no synonyms have been recorded. The authors do not explain the choice of the species name cinnamomea, but mention the flowers have a strong spicy scent that makes you think of cinnamon and cloves.

Distribution, ecology and conservation 
Babiana cinnamomea can be found in the Western Cape province of South Africa between Vanrhynsdorp in the south and the Langeberg north-west of Loeriesfontein. It grows at the base of mountains in rocky crevices in the Succulent Karoo biome, where it is apparently restricted to granite. Its pollinators have not been observed, but the combination of drab coloured flowers and spicy scent also occurs in Gladiolus liliaceus, which is visited by moths. It is from a remote, poorly explored area and was described relatively recently. It is known from six subpopulations that are scattered over a wide area. It is not threatened and therefore has been classified as a rare species.

References 

cinnamomea
Endemic flora of South Africa
Plants described in 2007